Kazu Wakita (7 June 1908 – 27 November 2005) was a Japanese painter. His work was part of the painting event in the art competition at the 1936 Summer Olympics.

References

1908 births
2005 deaths
20th-century Japanese painters
Japanese painters
Olympic competitors in art competitions
People from Tokyo